The 1990 Pearl Assurance British Open was a professional ranking snooker tournament, that was held from 18 February to 3 March 1990 with television coverage beginning on 24 February at the Assembly Rooms in Derby, England. It is an open draw for every round

Bob Chaperon won his only ranking event as he beat Alex Higgins who was appearing in his last major final.  
 


Main draw

Final

References

British Open (snooker)
1990 in snooker
1990 in British sport